Len Roberts (March 13, 1947 Cohoes, New York – May 25, 2007 Bethlehem, Pennsylvania) was an American poet.

Life
He graduated from Siena College, the University of Dayton with a master's degree, and from Lehigh University with a Ph.D.

He presented some of his work at Lafayette College.  Allen Ginsberg sent his manuscript to a publisher which was Cohoes Theater.

He translated three books of Hungarian poet Sándor Csoóri, whose writing helped to inspire the Hungarian Revolution of 1956.

He taught at the University of Pittsburgh, Muhlenberg College, Lafayette College, and Northampton Community College (for 33 years).

Awards
 1988, National Poetry Series Award, for Black Wings
 1991 John Simon Guggenheim Memorial Award for poetry
 two awards from the National Endowment for the Arts
 National Endowment for the Humanities Fellowship
 two Fulbright Scholar awards

Works

Poetry 
"Doing the Laundry"; "All day cutting wood, thinking"; "Contemplating Again the Jade Chrysanthemum, or Why the Ancient Chinese Poets Remained Unmarried"; "Acupuncture and Cleansing at Forty-Eight"; "Learning on Olmstead Street"; "More Walnuts, Late October", Poetry Magazine, April 2000
 Cohoes Theater. Santa Monica: Momentum Press, 1980.
 
 
 
 
 The Million Branches: Selected Poems and Interview. Mount Nebo: Yarrow Press, 1993.

Translations

Anthologies

References

External links
"Len Roberts, 1947-2007", Pittsburgh Quarterly

1947 births
2007 deaths
People from Cohoes, New York
American male poets
Hungarian–English translators
Siena College alumni
University of Dayton alumni
Lehigh University alumni
University of Pittsburgh faculty
Muhlenberg College faculty
Lafayette College faculty
20th-century translators
20th-century American male writers
Fulbright alumni